

Team rankings
 As of the 10th Season of the respected league. Placing was used to determine the rankings of the schools that have not made the top 3 in any conference once.

References